Apolemia uvaria, commonly known as string jellyfish, barbed wire jellyfish, and long stringy stingy thingy, is a siphonophore in the family Apolemiidae.

As with all siphonophores, string jellyfish may appear to be a single organism, but each specimen of Apolemia uvaria is a colony of specialised minute organisms called zooids. All the zooids are attached to each other and are physiologically connected to the extent that they cannot survive alone.

String jellyfish are colonial animals that may reach 3 m in total length and have a diameter of 2–5 cm. The colony is formed of a central string, bearing groups of pink and white tentacles, which clump together or extend. The whole colony has a gas float at the front and a set of swimming bells. This colonial animal is pelagic and is found in oceans worldwide in midwater.  These ocean predators act like drift nets, spreading their tentacles to catch plankton. The tentacles give a painful sting and are best avoided.

References

Apolemiidae
Cnidarians of the Atlantic Ocean
Cnidarians of the Pacific Ocean
Animals described in 1815
Taxa named by Charles Alexandre Lesueur